This list of the Cenozoic life of Delaware contains the various prehistoric life-forms whose fossilized remains have been reported from within the US state of Delaware and are between 66 million and 10,000 years of age.

A

 †Ameiseophis
 †Ameiseophis robinsoni
  †Amphicyon
 †Amphicyon longiramus
 Anadara
 †Anadara ovalis
 †Anchitheriomys
  †Anchitherium
 Anomia
 †Anomia simplex
 †Araloselachus
 †Araloselachus cuspidata
 †Archaeohippus
 †Archaeohippus blackbergi – or unidentified comparable form
 Argopecten
 †Argopecten irradians
  Astarte
 †Astarte distans
 Astyris
 †Astyris communis

B

 †Barbouromeryx
 †Barbouromeryx trigonocorneus
 Barnea
 †Barnea costata
 Bicorbula
 †Bicorbula idonea
 Busycon
 †Busycon perversum
 †Busycotyphus
 †Busycotyphus scalarispira
  Busycotypus
 †Busycotypus canaliculatus

C

 Cadulus
 †Cadulus conradi
 Caecum
 †Caecum calvertense
 †Calamagras
  Calliostoma
 †Calliostoma eboreus
 Calyptraea
 †Calyptraea centralis
 Cancellaria
 †Cancellaria alternata
 Carcharhinus
 †Carcharhinus brachyurus
 †Carcharhinus limbatus
 †Carcharhinus perezii
 Carcharodon
  †Carcharodon hastalis
 †Carcharodon subauriculatus
 Carditamera
 †Carditamera aculeata
 †Carinorbis
 †Carinorbis dalli
 Caryocorbula
 †Caryocorbula cuneata
 †Caryocorbula subcontracta
 Cerastoderma – report made of unidentified related form or using admittedly obsolete nomenclature
 †Cerastoderma calvertensium
 †Chesacardium
 †Chesacardium craticuloides
  †Chesapecten
 †Chesapecten coccymelus
 †Chesapecten sayanus
 †Chrysodomus
 †Chrysodomus patuxentensis
 Clementia
 †Clementia grayi
  Corbula
 †Corbula elevata
 Crassostrea
 †Crassostrea virginica
 Crepidula
 †Crepidula fornicata
 †Crepidula plana
  Crocodylus
 Crucibulum
 †Crucibulum costata
 Cyclocardia
 †Cyclocardia castrana
 Cymatosyrinx
 †Cymatosyrinx limatula
 Cymia
 †Cymia woodii
  †Cynelos

D

 †Dallarca
 †Dallarca subrostrata
 Diastoma
 †Diastoma insulaemaris
  Dinocardium
 Diodora
 †Diodora griscomi
 Donax
 †Donax idoneus
 Dosinia
 †Dosinia acetabulum

E

  †Ecphora
 †Ecphora tricostata
 Ensis
 †Ensis directus
 Epitonium
 †Epitonium charlestonensis
 Euspira
 †Euspira heros

F

  Ficus
 †Ficus harrisi
 †Florimetis
 †Florimetis biplicata

G

  Galeocerdo
 †Galeocerdo aduncus
 †Galeocerdo contortus
 Gavia
 Gemma
 †Gemma gemma
 Geochelone
 Geukensia
 †Geukensia demissa
 Glossus
 Glycymeris
 †Glycymeris parilis

H

 †Harrymys
 †Harrymys magnus
 Hemimactra
 †Hemimactra solidissima
 Hemipristis
  †Hemipristis serra

I

 Ilyanassa
 †Ilyanassa obsoleta
 †Ilyanassa trivittata
 †Inodrillia
 †Inodrillia whitfieldi
 Iphigenia
 Isognomon
 Isurus
  †Isurus oxyrinchus

K

  Kinosternon

L

 †Leptomactra
 †Leptomactra marylandica
 †Leptophoca
 †Leptophoca lenis
 Leucosyrinx
 †Leucosyrinx rugata
 Lirophora
 †Lirophora latilirata
 Littorina
  Lunatia
 †Lunatia hemicrypta

M

  Macoma
 †Macoma balthica
 Macrocallista
 †Macrocallista marylandica
  Mactra – report made of unidentified related form or using admittedly obsolete nomenclature
 †Mariacolpus
 †Mariacolpus plebeia
 †Marshochoerus
 †Marshochoerus socialis
 Martesia
 †Martesia ovalis
 †Marvacrassatella
 †Marvacrassatella melinus
  Melanella
 †Melanella eborea
 †Melanella migrans
 Mercenaria
 †Mercenaria ducatelli
  †Mercenaria mercenaria
 †Metatomarctus
 †Metatomarctus canavus – or unidentified comparable form
 Metula
 Modiolus
 †Modiolus ducatellii
 †Monosaulax
 Morus
 †Morus loxostylus – or unidentified comparable form
 Mulinia
 †Mulinia lateralis
 Murexiella
 †Murexiella cumberlandiana
 †Mya
  †Mya arenaria
 †Mya producta
 Mytiloconcha
 †Mytiloconcha incurva
 Mytilopsis
 †Mytilopsis ermiocenicus
 Mytilus
 †Mytilus edulis

N

  Nassarius
 †Nassarius spopora
 †Nassarius trivitattoides
 †Nassarius vibex
 Neverita
 †Neverita duplicatus
  Notorynchus
 Nucula
 †Nucula prunicola
 †Nucula taphria
 Nuculana
 †Nuculana liciata

O

 Oliva
 †Oliva simonsoni
  Ophisaurus

P

 Panopea
 †Panopea americana
 †Panopea whitfieldi
 †Paracynarctus
 †Paracynarctus kelloggi
  †Parahippus
 †Parahippus leonensis
 †Parvalucina
 †Parvalucina crenulata
 Pecten
 †Pecten humphreysii
 Periploma
 †Periploma peralta
   Petricola
 †Petricola pholadiformis
 †Phocageneus
 †Phocageneus venustus
 Pholas
 †Plesiosorex
 †Plesiosorex coloradensis – or unidentified comparable form
 †Pollackophis – type locality for genus
 †Pollackophis depressus – type locality for species
 Polystira
 †Polystira communis
 †Pterygoboa
 †Pterygoboa delawarensis – type locality for species
 †Ptychosalpinx

R

  Rhincodon

S

 Scaphella
 †Scaphella solitaria
 †Scaphella virginiana
  †Schizodelphis
 †Schizodelphis sulcatus
 Seila
 †Seila adamsii
 Semele
 †Semele subovata
 Serpulorbis
 †Serpulorbis granifera
  Sinum
 †Sinum chesapeakensis
 Siphonalia
 †Siphonalia devexus
 Solariorbis
 †Solariorbis lipara
  †Squalodon
 †Squalodon calvertensis
 Squalus
  Squatina
 Stewartia
 †Stewartia anodonta
 Strigilla
 †Strigilla georgiana – or unidentified comparable form

T

  Tagelus
 †Tagelus plebeius
 Tegula
 †Tegula marylandicum
 Teinostoma
 †Teinostoma nana
 Terebra
 †Terebra inornata
  Trigonostoma
 †Trigonostoma biplicifera
 †Tritonopsis
 †Tritonopsis ecclesiastica
 Trochita
 †Trochita aperta
 Turritella
 †Turritella cumberlandia
 †Turritella tampae
 †Tylocephalonyx – or unidentified comparable form
 Typhis
 †Typhis acuticosta

U

 Uca
  †Uca pugnax
 Urosalpinx
 †Urosalpinx subrusticus

Y

 Yoldia

Z

 †Zarhachis
 †Zarhachis flagellator

References
 

Cenozoic
Delaware